Saddle River Center Historic District, is located in Saddle River, Bergen County, New Jersey, United States. The district was added to the National Register of Historic Places on August 29, 1986.

See also
National Register of Historic Places listings in Bergen County, New Jersey

References

Historic districts on the National Register of Historic Places in New Jersey
Houses on the National Register of Historic Places in New Jersey
Colonial Revival architecture in New Jersey
Geography of Bergen County, New Jersey
National Register of Historic Places in Bergen County, New Jersey
Saddle River, New Jersey
Houses in Bergen County, New Jersey
New Jersey Register of Historic Places